The Brazil Billie Jean King Cup team represents Brazil in the Billie Jean King Cup tennis competition and are governed by the Brazilian Tennis Confederation.  They currently compete in the Americas Zone of Group I.

History
Brazil competed in its first Fed Cup in 1965.  Their best result was reaching the quarterfinals in 1982.

Current team (2018)
 Beatriz Haddad Maia
 Gabriela Cé
 Luisa Stefani
 Nathaly Kurata

See also
Fed Cup
Brazil Davis Cup team

External links

Billie Jean King Cup teams
Fed Cup
Tennis